Ancylophyes is a genus of moths of the family Tortricidae.

Species
Ancylophyes atrovirens (Razowski & Wojtusiak, 2008)
Ancylophyes monochroa Diakonoff, 1984
Ancylophyes praestabilis Razowski & Wojtusiak, 2012
Ancylophyes villosa (Razowski & Pelz, 2007)

See also
List of Tortricidae genera

References

 , 2005: World Catalogue of Insects, 5
 , 1988, Ent. Ber. 48: 195.
 , 2006, Monographs on Australian Lepidoptera Volume 10
 , 2012: Tortricidae (Lepidoptera) from Nigeria. Acta Zoologica Cracoviensia'' 55 (2)''': 59-130. Full article: .

External links
Tortricid.net

Enarmoniini
Tortricidae genera
Taxa named by Alexey Diakonoff